The 1899 Massachusetts gubernatorial election was held on November 8, 1899. Incumbent Republican Governor Roger Wolcott did not run for re-election to a fourth one-year term. Lt. Governor W. Murray Crane was elected to succeed him, defeating Democrat Robert Treat Paine.

General election

Results

See also
 1899 Massachusetts legislature

References

Governor
1899
Massachusetts
November 1899 events